Punguna (풍운아, Soldier of Fortune) is a 1926 Korean film. The silent, black-and-white film was written, directed, edited by and starred Na Woon-gyu (1902-1937). It premiered at the Choseon Theater in December 1926.

Plot summary
In Punguna, Na Woon-gyu plays the role of Nicolai Park, a veteran of the Russian army, who has returned to Korea from European battlefields. Broke, hungry, and unable to find employment, he is taken in as a boarder by Kim Chang-ho. Chang-ho's friend, Cha-duk becomes romantically involved with Hae-ok, who had sold herself to support her parents. Cha-duk's wife, Yeong-ja becomes involved with Nicolai, who rejects her proposal to run away with him. The romantic complications spiral until Yeong-ja kills Cha-duk. The film ends with Nicolai departing for destinations unknown while the other boarders bid him farewell.

Cast
Ju In-gyu (Ahn Jae-deok)
Kim Jeong-suk (Choi Yeong-ja)
Nam Gung-ung (Kim Chang-ho)
Joo Sam-son (Jeong Gu-jin)
Lim Woon-hak (Shin Do-seong)
Lee Gyeong-seon (Gwak Cheol-san)
Hong Myeong-seon (Cheon Il-hak)

See also
Korea under Japanese rule
List of Korean-language films
Cinema of Korea

References

External links
 

1926 films
Pre-1948 Korean films
Korean silent films
Korean black-and-white films
Films directed by Na Woon-gyu